2:22 may refer to:

 2:22 (2021 play), a 2021 English stage play
 2:22 (2008 film), a 2008 Canadian low-budget crime thriller
 2:22 (2017 film), an American-Australian thriller film

See also 
 222 (disambiguation)

Date and time disambiguation pages